Aleksei Ichetovkin, better known as Alex Ich, is a Russian retired professional League of Legends player. He is currently a streamer for the Pittsburgh Knights. During his professional career, Alex Ich played as the mid laner for several teams, including Moscow Five, Gambit Gaming, Renegades, Team Dragon Knights, Team Envy, and Ninjas in Pyjamas. During the peak of his career, around 2012, he was considered one of the best players in the world.

He joined Team Dragon Knights in a trade with Renegades on March 3, 2016. Ichetovkin retired in November 2018.

He currently works for Riot Games as a software engineer.

Tournament results

Moscow Five 
 1st — Intel Extreme Masters Season VII - Global Challenge Gamescom
 3rd–4th — Season 2 World Championship

Gambit Gaming 
 1st — IEM Season VII - Global Challenge Katowice
 1st — ESL Major Series Winter 2012
 3rd–4th — IEM Season VII - World Championship
 2nd — 2013 MLG Winter Championship International Exhibition
 2nd — Season 3 EU LCS Spring Playoffs
 3rd — Season 3 EU LCS Summer Playoffs
 5th–8th - Season 3 World Championship
 1st — IEM Season VIII - Cologne

Team Dragon Knights 
 Qualified — LCS Promotion

Team Envy 
 7th — 2016 NA LCS Summer regular season

References 

1992 births
Russian esports players
Moscow Five players
Gambit Gaming players
Ninjas in Pyjamas players
Renegades (esports) players
Team Dragon Knights players
Team Envy players
League of Legends mid lane players
Living people
Place of birth missing (living people)